Hasaki Ya Suda is a 2011 film.

Synopsis 
The year 2100. The global warming has caused massive droughts that have led to conflicts and famines. The first victims of the global warming are the Southern populations, forced to leave their lands to immigrate to the North. A massive exodus that makes chaos out of the known world order. Now, the earth is reduced to one giant no man's land. Lost and defenseless, the survivors have no choice but to return to ancestral rites. All over the world, clans form and fight for the last natural resources and fertile lands.

Awards 
 Festival International du Cinéma et de l'Audiovisuel du Burundi (FESTICAB) 2011
 Prix qualité CNC 2012

References

Sources

 Fespaco 2011
 Hasaki Ya Suda - Zanzibar International Film Festival 2013

External links 
 

2011 films
2011 short films
French short films
Burkinabé drama films
Burkinabé short films
2010s French films